"Risen" is a song by American rock band Sevendust. It was released on January 23, 2019, by Rise as the third single from the band twelfth studio album, All I See Is War.

Charts

References

Sevendust songs
2019 singles
Songs written by Lajon Witherspoon
Songs written by Clint Lowery
Songs written by John Connolly (musician)
Songs written by Vinnie Hornsby
Songs written by Morgan Rose